HKTDC Food Expo is organised in Hong Kong by the Hong Kong Trade Development Council (HKTDC) and held at the Hong Kong Convention and Exhibition Centre in August every year since 1989. The Expo includes a Trade Hall and a Public Hall. The Food Expo also includes a series of sessions in which food experts share their tips and cooking demonstrations by chefs.

The 2014 HKTCD Food Expo was held from 14 August 2014 to 18 August, 2014 at the Hong Kong Convention and Exhibition Centre.

Related events 
Hong Kong Int'l Tea Fair

References 
http://www.hktdc.com/fair/hkfoodexpo-en/
http://www.biztradeshows.com/trade-events/hongkong-food-expo.html
http://www.openrice.com/info/special_feature/hktdc/hktdc.htm
http://hk.news.yahoo.com/article/090807/4/dlc8.html
http://hk.apple.nextmedia.com/realtime/art_main.php?iss_id=20090813&sec_id=6996647&art_id=13093595
http://eventegg.com/hkfe-2014/

External links 

Trade fairs in Hong Kong